Vicatia is a genus of flowering plants belonging to the family Apiaceae. It is also in tribe Selineae.

Its native range stretches from Afghanistan, through Central Asia (within Kazakhstan, Kyrgyzstan Tajikistan, and Uzbekistan), parts of the Indian subcontinent (Assam, Nepal, Pakistan, West and East Himalaya), China (South-Central, Qinghai, Tibet and Xinjiang) and up to parts of Siberia, within Altai; (Altai Krai and Altai Republic), Krasnoyarsk and West Siberia.

Known species
As accepted by Kew:

Taxonomy
The genus name of Vicatia is in honour of Philippe-Rodolphe Vicat (1742–1783), a Swiss doctor and botanist in Warsaw, Poland, and also Lausanne, Switzerland. It was first described and published in Prodr. Vol.4 on page 243 in 1830.

References

Apioideae
Plants described in 1830
Flora of Afghanistan
Flora of Central Asia
Flora of the Indian subcontinent
Flora of South-Central China
Flora of Qinghai
Flora of Tibet
Flora of Xinjiang
Flora of Siberia